"Elektrobank" is a song by English electronic music duo the Chemical Brothers. It was released as a single from their second album, Dig Your Own Hole (1997), in September 1997. It peaked at number 17 on the UK Singles Chart. Spike Jonze directed the music video, which depicted a mixed artistic gymnastics / rhythmic gymnastics competition with his future wife Sofia Coppola as one of the competitors. It has been called "arguably Jonze's greatest music video". The single does not appear on either of the duo's singles compilations, Singles 93–03 and Brotherhood.

Samples
The vocals "Who is dis doin' this synthetic type of alpha beta psychedelic funkin'?" are taken from the song "This That Shit" by Keith Murray. The voice of the introduction is from DJ Kool Herc and was recorded live at the Irving Plaza in late 1996.

Track listings

Credits and personnel
Credits are lifted from the Dig Your Own Hole album booklet.

Studios
 Recorded at Orinoco Studios (South London, England)
 Mastered at The Exchange (London, England)

Personnel
 The Chemical Brothers – production
 Tom Rowlands – writing
 Ed Simons – writing
 Kool Herc – introduction voice, recorded live at Irving Plaza in late 1996
 Keith Murray – vocal sample
 Steve Dub – engineering
 Mike Marsh – mastering

Charts

Release history

References

External links
 

1997 songs
1997 singles
Astralwerks singles
The Chemical Brothers songs
Music videos directed by Spike Jonze
Songs written by Ed Simons
Songs written by Tom Rowlands
Virgin Records singles